Tasiocerellus is a genus of crane fly in the family Limoniidae.

Distribution
Sri Lanka.

Species
T. kandyensis Alexander, 1958

References

Limoniidae
Diptera of Asia